These are the number-one songs of 2004 in the Australian ARIA singles chart.

Chart history

Songs that peaked at number 2 include "Milkshake" by Kelis, "Here Without You" by 3 Doors Down, "I Don't Wanna Know" by Mario Winans and "Leave (Get Out)" by JoJo
Songs that peaked at number 3 include "Suga Suga" by Baby Bash
Other hit songs included "My Immortal" by Evanescence (4), "Behind Blue Eyes" (4),  "With You" by Jessica Simpson (4), "Four to the Floor" by Starsailor (5) and "So Beautiful" by Pete Murray (9).

References
Australian Record Industry Association (ARIA) official site
OzNet Music Chart

2004 in Australian music
Australia singles
2004